Dennis Schmitt (born May 23, 1946) is a veteran explorer, adventurer and composer.

Early life
Schmitt grew up in Berkeley, California, the son of mixed German and American parentage. His father was a plumber. Displaying early aptitude with languages, music and mathematics, Schmitt graduated from Berkeley High School in 1963, and went on to study linguistics at UC Berkeley with Noam Chomsky in his late teens. Chomsky recruited Schmitt, aged 19, to travel to Alaska's Brooks Range and attempt to learn the Nunamiut dialect.

Career 
Schmitt lived for four years at an Alaskan Eskimo village named Anaktuvuk Pass before leading expeditions, including the Sierra Club. In 2003, Schmitt discovered one of the candidates of being the northernmost land in the world. Deciding that Greenland should name its own islands, he simply called it "83-42", a name that has remained.

Two years later, in 2005, Schmitt discovered a new island formed by the retreat of an ice shelf in East Greenland. Uunartoq Qeqertaq, Inuit for "The Warming Island", lies 400 miles north of the Arctic Circle. The Sierra Club reported on a Schmitt quote to The New York Times:
"We felt the exhilaration of discovery. We were exploring something new. But of course, there was also something scary about what we did there. We were looking in the face of these changes, and all of us were thinking of the dire consequences."

Expeditions 
Schmitt is also credited with the July 2007 discovery of another of the candidates to the "northernmost island on Earth"-title, named Stray Dog West by expedition member Holly Wenger. Stray Dog West, at 83º40'30", belongs to a shifting, semi-permanent archipelago locked in the sea ice north of Peary Land in northeast Greenland, named the Stray Dog Islands. The first island of the archipelago was discovered on July 10, 1996 by Steve Gardiner and Jim Schaefer and is commonly known as the 1996 ATOW Island after the 1996 American - Top Of The World Expedition.

Schmitt was the first person to climb the highest point of the Daly Range, part of the northernmost mountain chain on Earth, as well as Alaska's Brooks Range from Point Hope to the Mackenzie River, and made the first traverse of Axel Heiberg Island, northern Canada. He also crossed the sea ice of the Bering Straits to the Soviet Union, and travelled through Eskimo villages of eastern Siberia. Upon his return, the FBI detained and released Schmitt without charge.

Musical works 
 Song Cycle I (Mental trash from warm bodies (plus extras))
 Prologue and Aurora (1977)
 The Alaska Wilderness Adventure (1978)

Personal life 
Schmitt speaks multiple languages, including Russian, Norwegian, Danish, and French. He lives in Berkeley and composes classical music, being credited for the soundtrack to the 1978 movie, The Alaska Wilderness Adventure.  Schmitt also writes sonnets under the pen name D O'Farrell.

See also 

 List of polar explorers
 Polar exploration
 History of Greenland

Notes

Further reading
 The Wizard. 1960. p. 28
 "Vista Volunteers Go North of Nome". The Daily Illini. May 12, 1966. p. 12 
 Severson, Ed (January 7, 1993). "A Spacious Mind". Arizona Daily Star. pp. 1c, 3C
 Russo, John; Schmitt, Dennis (1998; rev. 2019). Dutch Ovens for Backpacking, 28 pp.
 
 Burress, Charles (June 19, 2004). "Explorers finally reach Earth's northernmost land". Pittsburgh Post-Gazette. p. A-16

External links
 
 The American Alpine Journal has many articles dating back several years on Dennis Schmitt's explorations

1946 births
American explorers
American people of German descent
Berkeley High School (Berkeley, California) alumni
Living people
University of California, Berkeley people